Mathias Van Gompel (born 24 September 1995 in Meerhout) is a Belgian cyclist, who last rode for UCI Professional Continental team .

Major results
2013
 1st Grand Prix Bati-Metallo
 1st La Philippe Gilbert
 3rd  Road race, UEC European Junior Road Championships
2017
 4th Omloop Het Nieuwsblad Beloften
 6th Internationale Wielertrofee Jong Maar Moedig
2018
 8th Münsterland Giro

References

External links

1995 births
Living people
Belgian male cyclists
21st-century Belgian people